New Mills is a hamlet in Cornwall, England, United Kingdom.

References

Hamlets in Cornwall